Bohatice is a municipality and village in Česká Lípa District in the Liberec Region of the Czech Republic. It has about 200 inhabitants.

History
The first written mention of Bohatice is from 1304.

References

Villages in Česká Lípa District